Niklas Geyrhofer (born 11 February 2000) is an Austrian footballer who plays for SK Sturm Graz.

References

Living people
2000 births
Association football defenders
Austrian footballers
SK Sturm Graz players
Austrian Football Bundesliga players